Nosema bombycis is a species of Microsporidia of the genus Nosema infecting silkworms, responsible for pébrine.
This species was the first microsporidium described, when pebrine decimated silkworms in farms in the mid-19th century. This description was made by Carl Nägeli. Louis Pasteur, taking up an idea of Osimo which had not been successful, showed breeders a practical way to select uninfected individuals to recreate new healthy farms.

References

Biopesticides
Fungi described in 1857
Microsporidia
Parasitic fungi